is a Japanese freelance announcer and tarento who is a former TV Tokyo  announcer.

She was born in Gifu, Gifu Prefecture.

Biography
She attended Kita High School in Gifu Prefecture until her graduation. In March 2013, she graduated from the Tokyo Metropolitan University Department of Business Administration and Urban Liberal Arts Department. She later joined TV Tokyo in April of the same year together with Haruhi Nozawa. Immediately after joining the company she was appointed the joint host of late night programme Ichiya zuke with Nozawa.

In July 2013 she started hosting two programmes, News Morning Satellite and 7 St Live which were both broadcast on Wednesdays.

From January 2015 to December 2016 she was a presenter on Winning Keiba.

Personal life

Her special skill is shigin. She started when she was three years old and belonged to the University of Tokyo Shingin Studies Society at university.

On 12 January 2022, she announced that she is married with a male employee from yesterday.

Filmography

Currently appearing programmes

Others

Programmes that appeared in the past

Television dramas

References

External links
 

Japanese sports announcers
Actresses from Gifu Prefecture
1990 births
Living people
Japanese television actresses
21st-century Japanese actresses
Tokyo Metropolitan University alumni